Polyipnus latirastrus, commonly known as the combside hatchetfish, is a species of ray-finned fish in the family Sternoptychidae.

References

Sternoptychidae
Fish described in 1994